Kunlavut Vitidsarn (simply known as View; born 11 May 2001) is a Thai badminton player. He was three-times World Junior champion, winning in 2017, 2018 and 2019. Vitidsarn became the first men's singles player to win three World Junior Championships titles, joining Ratchanok Intanon and Chen Qingchen as a three-time winner of the World Junior title in the same discipline. He claimed the gold medal at the Asian Junior Championships in 2019, where he previously won a silver in 2018 and bronze in 2017. Vitidsarn participated at the 2018 Summer Youth Olympics, and was part of the team Omega took the silver medal in the mixed team event. He was named the 2020/2021 Eddy Choong Most Promising Player. In the senior category, he won the silver medal at the 2022 World Championships.

Achievements

BWF World Championships 
Men's singles

Southeast Asian Games 
Men's singles

BWF World Junior Championships 
Boys' singles

Asian Junior Championships 
Boys' singles

BWF World Tour (2 titles, 3 runners-up) 
The BWF World Tour, which was announced on 19 March 2017 and implemented in 2018, is a series of elite badminton tournaments sanctioned by the Badminton World Federation (BWF). The BWF World Tour is divided into levels of World Tour Finals, Super 1000, Super 750, Super 500, Super 300, and the BWF Tour Super 100.

Men's singles

BWF International Challenge/Series (5 titles, 2 runners-up) 
Men's singles

  BWF International Challenge tournament
  BWF International Series tournament
  BWF Future Series tournament

BWF Junior International (11 titles, 2 runners-up) 
Boys' singles

Boys' doubles

Mixed doubles

  BWF Junior International Grand Prix tournament
  BWF Junior International Challenge tournament
  BWF Junior International Series tournament
  BWF Junior Future Series tournament

Record against selected opponents 
Record against year-end Finals finalists, World Championships semi-finalists, and Olympic quarter-finalists. Accurate as of 22 January 2023.

References

External links 
 
 

2001 births
Living people
Kunlavut Vitidsarn
Kunlavut Vitidsarn
Badminton players at the 2018 Summer Youth Olympics
Competitors at the 2021 Southeast Asian Games
Kunlavut Vitidsarn
Southeast Asian Games medalists in badminton
Kunlavut Vitidsarn